Semenkovo is a rural locality (a village) in Staroselskoye Rural Settlement, Vologodsky District, Vologda Oblast, Russia. The population was 8 as of 2002.

Geography 
The distance to Vologda is 60km, to Striznevo is 11km. Kipelovo is the nearest locality.

References 

Rural localities in Vologodsky District